Nándor Litter (born 18 September 1953) is a Hungarian operating engineer and politician (MSZP), who served as Mayor of Nagykanizsa from 2002 to 2006. Formerly he had interests in the oil industry and worked for the MOL Group.

External links
 Hungarian Sociality Party member register - Nándor Litter

1953 births
Living people
Hungarian Socialist Party politicians
Mayors of places in Hungary